The 23rd century BC was a century that lasted from the year 2300 BC to 2201 BC.

Events

2334 BC – 2279 BC: (short chronology) Sargon of Akkad's conquest of Mesopotamia.
c. 2300 BC: Indus Valley civilisation (Harappan) flourishing in modern-day eastern Pakistan - western India.
c. 2300 BC: Metals start to be used in Northern Europe.
c. 2300 BC: Unetice culture emerges in the modern day Czech Republic.
c. 2300 BC: Canal Bahr Yusuf (current name) is created when the waterway from the Nile to the natural lake (now Lake Moeris) is widened and deepened to create a canal.
c. 2300 BC – 2200 BC: "Head of a man from Nineveh" (modern Kuyunjik, Iraq) is made. It is now in Iraq Museum, Baghdad.
c. 2300 BC – 2184 BC: Disk of Enheduanna, from Ur, (modern Muqaiyir, Iraq) is made. It is now in University of Pennsylvania Museum of Archaeology and Anthropology, University of Pennsylvania, Philadelphia.
c. 2300–2250 BC, reigns of Pepi I Meryre and Merenre Nemtyemsaf I, beginning of Pepi II Neferkares' rule, all of the Sixth Dynasty of Egypt.
c. 2288 BC: "Queen Merye-ankhnes and her son Pepy II" is sculpted,  Sixth dynasty of Egypt.  The alabaster statuette is now at The Brooklyn Museum of Art, New York.
c. 2285 BC: Enheduanna, high priestess of the moon god Nanna in Ur, was born.
c. 2254 BC – 2218 BC: Stela of Naram-Sin, probably from Sippar, discovered in Susa (modern Shush, Iran), is made. It is now in Musée du Louvre, Paris.
c. 2250 BC: The beginning of the Meghalayan Stage, the last of the three stages of the Holocene.
c. 2250 BC: Earliest evidence of maize cultivation in Central America.
c. 2240 BC: Akkad, capital of the Akkadian Empire, becomes the largest city in the world, surpassing Memphis, capital of Egypt.
c. 2220 BC: Scord of Brouster farmstead established in Shetland, Scotland
c. 2220 BC: Mount Edgecumbe (Alaska) volcano erupts near present-day Sitka, Alaska.
c. 2215 BC: A Guti army swept down from the Zagros Mountains and defeated the demoralized Akkadian army. They took Agade, the capital of Akkad, and destroyed it thoroughly.
c. July 2215 BC: Comet Hale-Bopp visits the inner solar system and would not return until the year AD 1997.

References 

 

 
-7
-77